Clover Margaret Moore (née Collins, born 22 October 1945) is an Australian politician. She has been the Lord Mayor of the City of Sydney since 2004 and is currently the longest serving Lord Mayor of Sydney since the creation of the City of Sydney in 1842. She was an independent member of the New South Wales Legislative Assembly from 1988 to 2012, representing the electorates of Bligh (1988–2007) and Sydney (2007–2012). Her "recurrent motif" is described as "making Sydney more liveable for individuals and families". Moore is the first popularly elected female Lord Mayor of Sydney.

Early life and background
Clover Margaret Collins was born in 1945 and grew up in the suburb of Gordon, on Sydney's North Shore, one of three daughters of Kathleen and Francis Collins. She attended Loreto Kirribilli at Kirribilli and Elm Court Dominican Convent, Moss Vale. Moore matriculated to the University of Sydney, and obtained a Bachelor of Arts in 1969 and a Diploma of Education from the Sydney Teachers' College, while residing at Sancta Sophia College. After graduation she began work as an English and History teacher at St Ives High School and Fort Street High School, before moving to London to teach for several years. Moore married Peter Moore, an architect, in 1972 and they had two children, Sophie and Tom. They returned to Australia five years later and settled in the inner-city suburb of Redfern. As a young mother in the Labor Party-dominated South Sydney Municipal Council, Moore became involved in a local resident action group and decided to run for Council in 1980 when she and other members of the group met, after three years of attempts, with the Mayor, Bill Hartup, regarding a local park which Hartup had demanded to have its grass replaced with asphalt (to aid street-sweepers in seeing broken glass), surrounded by barbed wire (to keep out the drunks at night), and to have its lone tree removed (a nuisance).

Moore was elected as an Independent Alderman for the Redfern Ward of the South Sydney Municipal Council at the 20 September 1980 election. Moore was one of three independents elected to the Council that formed a de facto opposition to the 9-member Labor caucus and Mayor Hartup who controlled the council and generally made most decisions in closed caucus meetings prior to Council meetings. However, in December 1981, the New South Wales Government amalgamated the South Sydney Council with the City of Sydney, and Moore became a Redfern Ward Alderman of the newly formed Sydney City Council from 1 January 1982. Moore developed a visible profile in the community, campaigning on a variety of issues both in her position as alderman and in the broader community, particularly in her home suburb of Redfern. Moore was interested in the environment, conservation, and heritage preservation, being involved in the unsuccessful campaign to save the 1936 Rural Bank Building in Martin Place and describing the ALP Lord Mayor, Doug Sutherland, as the "Judas of Martin Place" for his role in approving its demolition in 1982.

Moore ran again for re-election to the three-member Redfern Ward in the 14 April 1984 Council Election, and was highly successful, taking first position, outpolling Bill Hartup with a 21% swing against the ALP, and enabling the election of the second candidate on her independent ticket, Sue Willis, ahead of the sitting Labor Alderman Stan Champley. In May 1984, Moore ran for the position of Deputy Lord Mayor after the election, but was defeated by the main right-wing Labor candidate, Stan Ashmore-Smith, when the two Independent Communist Aldermen (Jack Mundey and Brian McGahen) sided with the Labor caucus in the vote. Moore proved a high profile campaigner on heritage preservation and environment conservation, gaining the ire of the Miscellaneous Workers' Union when she confronted a Council worker who was undertaking unsympathetic pruning to trees on a street in Redfern exclaiming "its hard enough for trees to survive city pollution without their being massacred by untrained workmen sent to prune them", and denouncing the Sydney Cricket Ground Trust as "architectural barbarians, insensitive to the traditions of the ground" for approving the demolition of the historic 1909 Sheridan Stand of the Sydney Cricket Ground, which was nonetheless razed in 1986.

In late 1986, Moore started her campaign to become the city's first female Lord Mayor and defeat incumbent Doug Sutherland, declaring "I think everyone would agree it is time for a breath of fresh air and a Lord Mayor committed enough to stay in Sydney to do the job" in a criticism of Sutherland's frequent international trips. However, in March 1987 the state government abruptly sacked the Sydney City Council and appointed a board of commissioners to run it until new elections could be held. Having been unceremoniously dismissed from her elected office, Moore, along with five other fellow former independent aldermen Frank Sartor, Bill Hunt, Brian McGahen, Sue Willis and Jack Mundey, formed 'Independent Watch', an informal grouping with the purpose of scrutinising the decisions of the appointed commissioners and pressing for elections for a new council.

Member of Parliament

Instead of standing again for council, Moore decided to run for the New South Wales Legislative Assembly as an independent at the 1988 election, like her previous rival for the Lord Mayor position and fellow former independent alderman, Frank Sartor, who had decided to run as an independent in the inner Sydney seat of McKell. Despite not having the backing of a party, she won the seat of Bligh, narrowly defeating Liberal member Michael Yabsley.

In 1991 she co-authored the New South Wales Charter of Reform of Government. In the same year, she was re-elected for a second term with a massive swing in her favour, increasing her share from 26.7 per cent to 43 per cent. Her power also increased dramatically when, along with fellow independents Peter Macdonald and Tony Windsor, she gained the balance of power in the Legislative Assembly. Moore was to again take the spotlight when the Independent Commission Against Corruption handed down a finding that was sharply critical of Liberal Premier Nick Greiner on 1 June 1992. While the findings were still pending a ruling in the NSW Court of Appeals, Moore and two other Independent MPs made a symbolic march to the NSW Parliament with a threat to withdraw their support of the coalition's minority-government. Hence before the Court ruling was handed down, Greiner's hand was forced, and he resigned on 24 June 1992.

She went on to hold her seat with a largely safe margin at the 1995 and 1999 elections. The LGBT community thanked her for her support by featuring likenesses of her in the Sydney Gay and Lesbian Mardi Gras parade that year. She was re-elected again in 2003.

Prior to the 2007 election, the Electoral Commission redistributed electoral boundaries, renaming Bligh to "Sydney", and moving the seat north and west to encompass the Sydney CBD. Moore was elected to the new seat of Sydney with an increased margin.

Although she sat as an independent in parliament, Moore often worked with other minor parties and independents, particularly with the Australian Democrats, who sponsored some of her bills in the upper house and Moore encouraged voters at the 2011 state election to vote for the Democrats in the upper house, along with South Coast Independent MP, John Hatton.

Moore resigned as a state MP as a result of new state laws (labelled in the media as the "Get Clover" laws) preventing dual membership of state parliament and local councils. Following her re-election as mayor in the 2012 elections, she was forced to resign the state seat she held for 24 years before the first meeting of the new council. This resulted in a 2012 Sydney by-election on 27 October in which she endorsed independent candidate Alex Greenwich of the Australian Marriage Equality advocacy group who won in a landslide victory. On her departure, former city councillor Elizabeth Farrelly opined: "In her 20 years as MP, with more successful private member's bills than anyone in a century, Moore has done more to keep the bastards honest than Don Chipp ever did. And in her eight years as lord mayor, she has proved repeatedly that it's more confluence than conflict."

Lord Mayor of Sydney

In early 2004, the Labor Party government under Bob Carr sacked and re-amalgamated the City of Sydney and South Sydney Councils. The move came largely as a surprise, with then-Lord Mayor Lucy Turnbull being notified by a fax posted under her door. The decision to amalgamate the two councils was widely interpreted by the media as an attempt to get the Labor candidate, former federal minister Michael Lee, elected as Lord Mayor, as it would bring a large area of largely Labor-voting suburbs into the City of Sydney. However, several of these suburbs also made up Moore's state electorate of Bligh.

When Turnbull announced soon after that she would not seek re-election, Lee appeared to have the position won. Then, on 24 February, Moore entered the race, labelling the council's sacking a "cynical grab for power." Despite her ideological differences with Turnbull, she also sharply denounced the sacking of a democratically elected mayor. By the following day, The Sydney Morning Herald was already predicting that she would present a serious challenge to Lee.

Despite a spirited challenge from Lee, Moore won the election, finishing with more than double the vote of Less as her nearest rival, and ABC election analyst Antony Green announced that she would "romp through" to win, only 90 minutes after counting began.

Though she had made a point of not directing voting preferences in her four election campaigns in the Legislative Assembly, Moore decided to support a team of independents for the council race. This turned out to be quite successful, with four of her team of six – John McInerney, Robyn Kemmis, Marcelle Hoff and Phillip Black – being elected to council.

In 2008 NSW local government elections Moore was re-elected as Lord Mayor of Sydney. She was returned on a reduced majority in 2012, winning 51.1% of the Mayoral vote. In the 2016 NSW local government elections she was comfortably returned to office, improving her vote 8.0% to win 59.1% of the popular vote.

After introducing bike lanes through many parts of inner Sydney, Moore broke an ankle on Ride to Work Day in October 2010, while dismounting from her bike, necessitating that she attend some events in a wheelchair.

Energy efficiency
Under Moore's leadership, the city of Sydney is aiming to reduce carbon emissions 70 per cent by 2030. It has installed bicycle lanes; upgraded its car fleet to hybrids; planted 10,000 trees; provided 600 on-street car-share spaces; installed Sydney's largest building-based solar photovoltaic system; installed water harvesting in 11 major parks and voted to install two new trigeneration plants.

Moore stated in an article on Impakter.com in September 2018 that emissions in Sydney have been reduced by 52% and the use of water by 36% since the year 2006 and that the city aims to become carbon neutral.

Building and infrastructure
Since becoming Mayor, Moore has been able to bring to completion the construction of several buildings and pieces of infrastructure.
 Ian Thorpe Aquatic Centre (formerly "Ultimo Aquatic Centre") by Harry Seidler
 Surry Hills City of Sydney Library by FJMT (Francis-Jones Morehen Thorpe)
 Paddington Reservoir Gardens by TZG (Tonkin Zulaikha Greer)
 Redfern Park by BVN (Bligh Voller Nield)
 Reg Bartley Oval grandstand and kiosk, Rushcutters Bay, by Lacoste+Stevenson
 Pirrama Park in Pyrmont by Aspect Studios Landscape Architecture, Hill Thalis Architecture + Urban Projects and CAB Consulting.
 Prince Alfred Park makeover near Central railway station by Rachel Neeson and Nick Murcutt.
 Burton Street Tabernacle (to become the new Tabernacle Theatre)
There are also:
 Parks throughout Glebe, Pyrmont, Surry Hills, Rosebery, Elizabeth Bay and St Peters
 The introduction of a system of cycleways for Sydney, an idea at first criticised and then embraced. The state government tore up one cycleway, subsequently reinstated, and is co-funding another down Oxford Street, noting that cycling increased with the impact of the Covid-19 pandemic.

Controversies
On 27 October 2007 Moore proposed a Private Members Bill that would ban the sale of dogs, cats and other mammals in NSW pet stores, and effectively ban the breeding of crossbred dogs.  The Pet Industry Association responded with a petition opposing the legislation. The RSPCA Australia has given its support to the measure, although it was rejected by NSW purebred dog breeders.

Bike lanes constructed through Sydney angered many local residents for reducing parking and critics attacked the cost while other groups, including local headmasters and school groups, applauded them. The Bourke Street Cycleway won a Sydney Design Award in 2012.

The "City of Sydney Amendment (Elections) Bill" became law in September 2014, replacing one optional vote per business with two compulsory votes and it has been alleged that this is one of "two statutes designed to bar her from public life".

It has been criticised for both the rise in cost, after a re-design, and for not being suited to the city's aesthetic.

References

External links

 Official site
 
 
 

1945 births
Living people
University of Sydney alumni
Australian schoolteachers
Australian people of Irish descent
Independent politicians in Australia
Independent members of the Parliament of New South Wales
Mayors and Lord Mayors of Sydney
Members of the New South Wales Legislative Assembly
Women mayors of places in New South Wales
21st-century Australian politicians
21st-century Australian women politicians
Women members of the New South Wales Legislative Assembly